Littleton Wilde Moore (March 25, 1835 – October 29, 1911) was a U.S. Representative from Texas.

Biography
Born in Marion County, Alabama, Moore moved to Mississippi in 1836.
He graduated from the University of Mississippi at Oxford in 1855.
He studied law and was admitted to the bar in 1857.
He moved to Texas in 1857 and commenced practice in Bastrop.
He served as a captain in the Confederate States Army throughout the Civil War.

Moore was elected to the State constitutional convention in 1875.
He served as district judge 1876-1885.

Moore was elected as a Democrat to the Fiftieth, Fifty-first, and Fifty-second Congresses (March 4, 1887 – March 3, 1893).
He resumed the practice of his profession.
He was appointed judge of the twenty-second judicial district in 1901 and served until his death in La Grange, Texas, October 29, 1911.
He was interred in the City Cemetery.

References

Sources

1835 births
1911 deaths
Confederate States Army officers
Democratic Party members of the United States House of Representatives from Texas
Texas state court judges
19th-century American politicians
People from Marion County, Alabama
People from La Grange, Texas
19th-century American judges
Military personnel from Texas